The 1957–58 Allsvenskan was the 24th season of the top division of Swedish handball. 10 teams competed in the league. Redbergslids IK won the league and claimed their fifth Swedish title. IFK Kristianstad and IFK Borås were relegated.

League table

References 

Swedish handball competitions